Trout Creek flows into the Black River near Dexter, New York.

References 

Rivers of New York (state)
Rivers of Jefferson County, New York